David Mair (born 26 July 1980, in Meran) is an Italian luger and former skeleton racer. He competed until 2002 as a natural track luger, then until 2007 as a skeleton racer and switched back to natural track luge in 2009.

Natural track career
As a natural track luger, Mair won a bronze medal at the FIL European Luge Natural Track Championships 1999, a gold medal at the FIL World Luge Natural Track Championships 2000 and a silver medal at the FIL World Luge Natural Track Championships 2001 in the Men's doubles with his brother Armin Mair. He also won a gold medal at the FIL World Luge Natural Track Championships 2001 in the mixed team event.

After five years as a skeleton racer he gave his comeback as a natural track luger in 2009.

Skeleton career
In 2002 Mair switched to skeleton. In 2007 he finished seventh in the team event at the FIBT World Championships.

References
 FIL-Luge profile including his results since 2009 (Note: all his results until 2002 are mistakenly in the FIL-Luge profile of the artificial track luger of the same name)
 FIBT profile

External links

 
 

1980 births
Living people
Italian male lugers
Italian male skeleton racers
Italian lugers
Sportspeople from Merano